"Spread Your Love" is a song recorded by R&B/funk band Earth, Wind & Fire and released as a single in June 1983 by Columbia Records. The single reached No. 48 on the Dutch Pop Singles chart and No. 57 on the US Billboard Hot R&B Singles chart.

Overview
"Spread Your Love" was produced by EWF bandleader Maurice White and composed by White, Azar Lawrence and Beloyd Taylor. The single's b-side was a tune called Hearts to Heart. Both songs came from Earth, Wind & Fire's 1983 studio album Powerlight.

Critical reception
Chip Stern of Musician noted that "Robert Greenidge's slithery steel drums featured on the Eastern-tinged Spread Your Love". Craig Lytle of Allmusic proclaimed "the (song's) sonically aggressive special effects are contrasted with a soothing chanting chorus."

Charts

References

1983 singles
1983 songs
Earth, Wind & Fire songs
Columbia Records singles